Saša Zagorac (born 1 January 1984) is Slovenian retired professional basketball player. He stands 2.06 m and plays as forward. He is younger brother of Željko Zagorac. He announced his retirement on 18 July 2020.

National team career
Zagorac was a member of Slovenia U18, U19, U20, and U21 national team. He played at 2005 FIBA Under-21 World Championship. He represented Slovenia at the 2015 EuroBasket where they were eliminated by Latvia in eighth-finals. In 2017 he became a champion in European Basketball Championship; with his experiences he played an important role in Slovenian team's mental preparation and scored some crucial points in semi-final's win over Spain.

References

External links
euroleague.net
solobaket.com
fiba.basketball

1984 births
Living people
ABA League players
Andrea Costa Imola players
CB Clavijo players
Centers (basketball)
Club Melilla Baloncesto players
FIBA EuroBasket-winning players
Israeli Basketball Premier League players
Kapfenberg Bulls players
KK Cedevita Olimpija players
KK Grosuplje players
KK Krka players
KK Olimpija players
KK Zlatorog Laško players
Lega Basket Serie A players
Parma Basket players
PBC Academic players
Power forwards (basketball)
Slovenian expatriate basketball people in Italy
Slovenian expatriate basketball people in Spain
Slovenian expatriate basketball people in Israel
Slovenian expatriate basketball people in Austria
Slovenian expatriate basketball people in Bulgaria
Slovenian men's basketball players
Soproni KC players
Basketball players from Ljubljana
Teramo Basket players